{{DISPLAYTITLE:C21H19F2N3O3}}
The molecular formula C21H19F2N3O3 (molar mass: 399.39 g/mol) may refer to:

 Difloxacin
 RWJ-51204

Molecular formulas